"Killer Queen" is a 1974 song by the British rock band Queen.

Killer Queen may also refer to:
 "Killer Queen" (Family Guy), an episode of the animated sitcom Family Guy
 Killer Queen: A Tribute to Queen, a tribute album to the band Queen
 Killer Queen (video game)
 Killer Queen (drag queen), Spanish drag queen
 Killer Queen, a Stand power used by the main antagonist Yoshikage Kira in Jojo's Bizarre Adventure: Diamond Is Unbreakable.